Mopa Breweries, Ltd. is a Nigerian brewery founded in 1980 by  Chief J. Adewale Bello in Kogi State, Nigeria. The brewery is based in the town of Mopa in the Mopa-Muro Local Government Area. In 2005, the Canadian company Alexus-NextGen bought a controlling interest.

Beers
The company produces One Lager, a popular lager, Lion Stout, and non-alcoholic malt beverages.

See also

Consolidated Breweries
Guinness Nigeria
 List of beer and breweries in Nigeria
Nigerian Breweries

References

External links
Mopa Breweries

Breweries in Nigeria
Economy of Kogi State